Zemaitis may refer to:

Alan Zemaitis (born 1982), American NFL football player
Tony Zemaitis (1935–2002), British guitar maker
Zemaitis Guitars, guitar-making company